The Ministry of Energy and Electrification (Minenergo) was a government ministry in the Soviet Union.  It was the agency responsible for the Soviet Union's electricity policies.

The State Committee for Power and Electrification was upgraded to ministerial status (union-republic) in 1965; changed to all-union on 17 July 1987.

List of ministers
Source:
 Ignati Novikov (25.4.1962 - 24.11.1962)
 Pjotr Neporozhny (26.11.1962 - 23.3.1985)
 Anatoli Mayorets (24.3.1985 - 17.7.1989)
 Juri Semjonov (17.7.1989 - 24.8.1991)

References

Energy and Electrification
Soviet Union